Alexander Peter Cockburn (April 7, 1837 – June 2, 1905) was a Canadian businessman and political figure. He represented Victoria North in the 1st Parliament of Ontario and Muskoka and then Ontario North in the House of Commons of Canada as a Liberal member from 1872 to 1887.

He was born in Finch in 1837, the son of Scottish immigrants. He moved to Kirkfield with his family in 1857. He opened a store there in 1863 and became postmaster. He was reeve of Eldon Township from 1864 to 1865. In 1864, he moved to Orillia. After a visit to the Muskoka District in 1865, he moved to Gravenhurst, where he opened a general store, established stagecoach service and initiated steamboat service on Lake Muskoka. In 1867, he helped found the Muskoka Settler's Association and became its first president. While in office, he lobbied for improved rail and water links to the region. Cockburn also published pamphlets describing the natural beauty of the region, aimed at promoting tourism. His steamboat operation expanded to ten ships and a booming resort industry developed in the Muskoka region, that has continued to the present time.

He died in Toronto in 1905.

External links

Cockburn Family archival papers held at the University of Toronto Archives and Records Management Services

1837 births
1905 deaths
Members of the House of Commons of Canada from Ontario
Liberal Party of Canada MPs
Ontario Liberal Party MPPs
People from the United Counties of Stormont, Dundas and Glengarry
People from Gravenhurst, Ontario
Canadian people of Scottish descent